Instrument may refer to:

Science and technology
 Flight instruments, the devices used to measure the speed, altitude, and pertinent flight angles of various kinds of aircraft
 Laboratory equipment, the measuring tools used in a scientific laboratory, often electronic in nature
 Mathematical instrument, devices used in geometric construction or measurements in astronomy, surveying and navigation
 Measuring instrument, a device used to measure or compare physical properties
 Medical instrument, a device used to diagnose or treat diseases
 Optical instrument, relies on the properties of light
 Quantum instrument, a mathematical object in quantum theory combining the concepts of measurement and quantum operation
 Scientific instrument, a device used to collect scientific data
 Surgical instrument
 Vehicle instrument, a device measuring parameters of a vehicle, such as its speed or position
 Weather instrument, a device used to record aspects of the weather

Music
 Musical instrument, a device designed to produce musical sounds
 Experimental musical instrument 
 Percussion instrument, which is struck
 String instrument, uses vibrating strings
 Transposing instrument, allows music to be played in a different key
 Wind instrument, which is blown
 Brass instrument, a sub type of wind instruments
 Woodwind instrument, another sub type
 Instrument (album), by To Rococo Rot, 2014
 Instrument Soundtrack, 1999 album by American band Fugazi

Other uses
 Instrument (film), a documentary of the band Fugazi, directed by Jem Cohen
 Instruments (application), a performance visualizer
 Instrumental variable, a method used in statistics
 Financial instrument, a formal documentation of a financial transaction
 Legal instrument, a formal documentation of a status or transaction
 Negotiable instrument, a type of contract
 Statutory instrument, a form of legislation
 Instrumental case, in linguistics, a grammatical case expressing the instrument by which an action is performed

See also
 
 Tool
 Instrumentation (disambiguation)